WTRT (88.1 FM) is a Christian radio–formatted radio station licensed to Benton, Kentucky, United States, and serving the Jackson Purchase area of western Kentucky, including Paducah.  WTRT is owned by Heartland Ministries, Inc. as part of a triopoly with contemporary Christian station WAAJ (89.7 FM) and Christian radio station WVHM (90.5 FM). All three stations share studios on College Street in downtown Hardin, Kentucky, while WTRT's transmitter facilities is located off Dowdy Cemetery Road south of Benton.

History
WTRT signed on in 1999 as the third station in the Heartland Ministries organization.

Programming
The station airs a format consisting of modern praise and worship as well as a few Christian talk and teaching programs. Syndicated programming on WTRT includes Focus on the Family, James Dobson, and Alistair Begg.

References

External links
WTRT's official website

TRT